Rachel B. Glaser is an American poet, novelist and short story writer.

Glaser was born in New Jersey.

She has published four books to date: Pee On Water (short stories), Moods (poetry), Hairdo (poetry), and Paulina and Fran (novel). Publishers Weekly praised Hairdo for "Glaser's funny, shrewd, and warped perspective". Paulina and Fran was positively received.

Glaser was named as one of the best young American novelists by Granta magazine in 2017.

References

External links
 

American women writers
Living people
Year of birth missing (living people)
21st-century American women